Mangelia posidonia is a species of sea snail, a marine gastropod mollusc in the family Mangeliidae.

Description
The length of the shell attains 5 mm, its diameter 2 mm.

This is a solid white shell with a short fusiform shape. It contains 8 whorls of which 2½ smooth, vitreous whorls in the protoconch. The subsequent whorls are much impressed at the suture. They contain a few axial ribs, crossed spirally by angulate lirae (eight lirae in the body whorl). The narrow aperture is oblong. The outer lip is incrassate. The columella is simple.

Distribution
This marine species occurs in the Gulf of Oman.

References

External links
  Tucker, J.K. 2004 Catalog of recent and fossil turrids (Mollusca: Gastropoda). Zootaxa 682:1-1295.
 

posidonia
Gastropods described in 1904